Akbar Pray (born Wayne B. Pray on March 22, 1948) is an American writer, columnist and convicted  drug kingpin from Newark, New Jersey who is serving a life sentence in prison.

Pray headed a narcotics operations that distributed millions of dollars worth of cocaine and marijuana into Essex County, New Jersey from the early 1970s to the late 1980s.

The Pray organization called itself The Family, and consisted of more than 300 active members. In addition to its drug distribution networks, the group had been active in real estate ventures, and weapons dealing.

Once described as "untouchable" by law enforcement, Pray was sentenced to life without possibility of parole in 1990.

Criminal career
Pray was born in Newark in 1948.  Starting off as a street hustler, was soon operating a major drug ring.

The Afro-Lineal Organized Crime Report: The Family (North)
For several years, NJ's State Commission of Investigation (SCI or Commission) had developed intelligence on Afro-lineal mobs. These efforts culminated in a public hearing on November 29, 1990. The Afro-Lineal Organized Crime Report summarizes the public hearing. Within the report concerning Pray's The Family organization, it reads as follows:

Arrest and conviction
On June 21, 1988 Pray and four subordinates were indicted under the federal drug kingpin statute. He was arrested in Boca Raton, Florida by federal authorities, accused of leading an organized cocaine and marijuana trafficking enterprise. Federal officials estimated that his organization distributed 341 kilos of cocaine and 354 kilos of marijuana in less than two years, grossing more than $4.5 million annually.

Pray traveled throughout the United States, making deals and arranging for transportation of narcotics. He also traveled to Colombia and the West Indies to purchase his supply of cocaine.

His seven-month trial consisted of the testimony of 126 "document" witnesses, being hotel staff, car salesmen and retail clothing store employees, all solicited to testify to Pray's extravagant spending and lifestyle, as part of the prosecution's "substantial wealth" case against him. This ideology behind the case was that Pray made and spent copious amounts of money, far more than could be accounted for by legitimate means.

On January 12, 1990, Pray was sentenced under the federal drug kingpin statute to life in prison without parole.

As of June 2021, Pray was serving his life sentence at FMC Butner, a medical prison facility in Butner, North Carolina.

Prison activities
In prison, Pray wrote the book "The Death of the Game", which warns youth of the detrimental realities associated with the street life. He is also a columnist and regular contributor to Don Diva magazine, a contributing writer to Nikki Turner's "Tales From Da Hood" and co-author of "The Street Chronicles" with Nikki Turner.

Pray also serves as Editor in Chief of Gangster Chronicles. Pray's CD "Akbar Speaks" invaded the mix tape circuit and allowed Pray's voice to be heard via a medium relevant to today's youth.

Pray is the CEO and Founder of Akbar Pray's Foundation For Change (APFFC). His APFFC non-profit organization is dedicated to re-directing the lives of at-risk urban youth.

Health
Pray suffers with hypertension, prostate problems, and glaucoma. He is also in need of double hip replacement surgery.

References 

 

Sun Sentinel
Afro-Lineal Organized Crime Report

External links
Akbar Pray Official Website
Akbar Pray Foundation For Change (APFFC)

1948 births
Living people
African-American gangsters
American gangsters
American drug traffickers
American crime bosses
Gangsters from Newark, New Jersey
Criminals from New Jersey
21st-century African-American people
20th-century African-American people